The Sultan Azlan Shah Cup is an annual invitational international men's field hockey tournament held in Malaysia. It began in 1983 as a biennial contest. The tournament became an annual event after 1998, following its growth and popularity. The tournament is named after the ninth Yang di-Pertuan Agong (King) of Malaysia, Sultan Azlan Shah, a supporter of field hockey.

Since 2007 the tournament has been held at the Azlan Shah Stadium in Ipoh, Perak. Kuala Lumpur and Penang have also hosted the tournament.

Results

Summary
Below is a list of teams that have finished in the top four positions in the tournament:

* = Played as England in those tournaments
^ = Title was shared between two teams

Team appearances

Performance by continental zones

See also 
 Sultan of Johor Cup
 Malaysian Hockey Confederation

Notes

References

External links
 

 
International field hockey competitions in Asia
International field hockey competitions hosted by Malaysia
Recurring sporting events established in 1983